Dayo Audi (Dayo Audifferen) is active in the sport of bodybuilding, not only as a competitor but also in training fitness enthusiasts and athletes up to national level. Dayo Audi achieved professional status in 1999, competing for the first time in the Masters Olympia in the US in August 2003, where he achieved 11th place.

Dayo Audi holds regional, national, European and World titles from three major Federations, retiring from competitive bodybuilding in November 2008 after winning the WBBF Mr Universe title in Vilnius, Lithuania.

He is also an International judge with the WFF, qualifying in 2002 and served in the same capacity with NABBA from 2003 until leaving the organisation in 2007.

Still actively involved in the sport, Dayo organises independent shows and has successfully run the SportsPN Classic – a non-political/non-federational show – for the last 4 years.

In May 2009 at the Doncaster Dome, Dayo staged his first Strongman event in collaboration with Colin Bryce of Power Productions UK. The England's Strongest Man contest was part of the World's Strongest Man Qualifying Tour. Raw Power Sunday was the first of further Strongman events planned for the future.

Bodybuilders
Living people
English bodybuilders
1961 births
Professional bodybuilders
Place of birth missing (living people)